The Gerhartsreiter Schichten is a Mesozoic geologic formation in Bavaria, Germany.

Fossils Found
Dinosaur remains, including those of an indeterminate hadrosaur, are among the fossils that have been recovered from the formation, although none have yet been referred to a specific genus.

See also

 List of dinosaur-bearing rock formations
 List of stratigraphic units with indeterminate dinosaur fossils

Footnotes

References
 Weishampel, David B.; Dodson, Peter; and Osmólska, Halszka (eds.): The Dinosauria, 2nd, Berkeley: University of California Press. 861 pp. .

Geologic formations of Germany
Maastrichtian Stage

Upper Cretaceous Series of Europe